Malacatán Airport  is an airport serving the town of Malacatán in the San Marcos Department of Guatemala.

See also
 
 
 Transport in Guatemala
 List of airports in Guatemala

References

External links
 OurAirports - Malacatán
 FallingRain - Malacatán Airport
 OpenStreetMap - Malacatán
 

Airports in Guatemala
San Marcos Department